Barry Michael Joseph Dineen  (born 17 September 1936) is a New Zealand businessman, and former cricketer and rugby union player. He played in eleven first-class cricket matches for Canterbury and Central Districts from 1956 to 1964. He played as a fullback in rugby, representing , and touring with the Junior All Blacks to Japan in 1958.

Dineen was appointed a Companion of the New Zealand Order of Merit, for services to business and the arts, in the 2013 New Year Honours.

References

External links
 

1936 births
Living people
New Zealand cricketers
Canterbury cricketers
Central Districts cricketers
Cricketers from Christchurch
Companions of the New Zealand Order of Merit
New Zealand businesspeople
New Zealand rugby union players
Canterbury rugby union players
Rugby union fullbacks
Rugby union players from Christchurch